Bernard Russell Gelbaum (died March 22, 2005 Laguna Beach, California) was a mathematician and academic administrator having served as a professor at the University of Minnesota, University of California, Irvine (where he was the first chair of the math department as well as acting dean and associate dean of physical sciences) and as well as emeritus professor in the Department of Mathematics, College of Arts and Sciences, University at Buffalo.  When he arrived at Buffalo 1971, he served as vice president for academic affairs as well as being a math professor.

Biography
While still an undergraduate at Columbia University, Gelbaum served as a second lieutenant in the U.S. Signal Corps and was one of the first to liberate the Buchenwald concentration camp.  He went on to get his doctorate at Princeton University in 1948. His dissertation, Expansions in Banach Spaces, was supervised by Salomon Bochner.

References

2005 deaths
United States Army personnel of World War II
Year of birth missing
Princeton University alumni
University of Minnesota faculty
University of California, Irvine faculty
University at Buffalo faculty
Leaders of the University at Buffalo
American mathematicians

Columbia College (New York) alumni